Oviballus is a monotypic genus of southern African jumping spiders containing the single species, Oviballus vidae. It was first described by G. N. Azarkina and C. R. Haddad in 2020, and it has only been found in South Africa.

See also
 List of Salticidae genera

References

Monotypic Salticidae genera
Spiders of South Africa